Oedaspis villeneuvei is a species of tephritid or fruit flies in the genus Oedaspis of the family Tephritidae.

Distribution
Algeria, Libya, Egypt, Israel.

References

Tephritinae
Insects described in 1913
Taxa named by Mario Bezzi
Diptera of Africa